HMCS Toronto may refer to:

 was a  frigate that served in the Second World War. It was sold in 1956.
 is a  that has served since 1993.

Battle honours
Gulf of St. Lawrence, 1944
Arabian Sea

See also

References

Directory of History and Heritage - HMCS Toronto 

Royal Canadian Navy ship names